Woodhouselee is an estate in Midlothian in the parish of Glencorse.  It has been owned by gentry including William Tytler and Alexander Fraser Tytler.  There is a mansion, now called Firth House, and the ruined 16th-century castle of Old Woodhouselee which was owned by James Hamilton, who assassinated the Regent of Scotland – the first recorded assassination with a firearm.

References

Castles in Midlothian
Country houses in Midlothian
World War II prisoner of war camps in Scotland